The Battle of Koporye took place on October 8, 1708 close to Koporye, in the Swedish Empire during the Ingrian campaign in the Great Northern War. A Swedish force consisting of 1,800 men under the command of generals Carl Gustaf Armfeldt and Anders Erik Ramsay attacked a numerically stronger enemy of between 2,000 and 3,000 Russian forces. The battle ended in a Swedish victory with about 600 Russians killed and only 70 dead among the Swedish force. After further campaigning, the Swedish–Finland army under the command of Georg Lybecker decided to evacuate his troops, having failed at his objectives.

References

Conflicts in 1708
1708 in Europe
Koporye
Koporye
Koporye
History of Leningrad Oblast